Raoul de Ferrières (fl. 1200–10), originally de Ferier, was a Norman nobleman and trouvère. He was born in Ferrières in what is today the département of Eure. A total of eleven chansons courtoises have been attributed to him.

In 1209, Raoul was mentioned in a donation to the Abbey of Noé.

The most famous of Raoul's songs is unquestionably Quant li rossignols jolis ("When the pretty nightingales"), which is probably the song Johannes de Grocheo (c.1300) describes as a cantus coronatus (crowned, meaning probably that it had received a prize in a competition). This song is ascribed to the Chastelain de Couci in another manuscript. It was used as a model for the anonymous L'autrier m'iere rendormis. Musically, it starts at the upper octave, flows downwards, and establishes a centre on d.

All of Raoul's melodies, including Quant li rossignols, were recorded in bar form, save two readings Si sui du tout a fine Amour (possibly later revisions). None are recorded in mensural notation. Most of the melodies are in the D modes (authentic and plagal), but three are in the authentic G mode. Poetically, all but one of Raoul's compositions use the ABABBAAB rhyme scheme and all of his works are also octosyllabic, with the heptasyllabic exceptions of Quant ivers a tel poissance and Quant li rossignols and the mixed octo- and heptasyllabic verses of the disputed Quant il ne pert fueille ne flours.

List of songs

Assigned works
Encore m'estuet il chanter
Par force chant conme esbahis
Quant ivers a tel poissance
Quant je voi les vergiers florir
Se j'ai chanté, ce poise moi
Si sui du tout a fine Amour
Une haute amour qui esprent

Doubtful works
J'ai oublié paine et travaus
On ne peut pas a deus seigneurs servir
Quant li rossignols jolis
Quant il ne pert fueille ne flours

References
Karp, Theodore. "Raoul de Ferrières." Grove Music Online. Oxford Music Online. Accessed 20 September 2008.



Trouvères
12th-century Normans
Male classical composers